"Hold On to Me" is a song recorded by American country music artist John Michael Montgomery. It was written by Blair Daly and Will Rambeaux, and produced by Montgomery and Csaba Petocz. It was released in September 1998 as the third and final single from his album Leave a Mark.  It peaked at number four in both the United States and Canada.

Critical reception
Deborah Evans Price of Billboard magazine reviewed the song favorably, saying that "there's a simple honesty in the lyric of this song." She goes on to say that the production is skilled and the emphasis is on Montgomery's "self-assured vocal performance."

Music video
The music video was directed by Jim Shea and premiered in early 1999.

Chart positions
"Hold On to Me" debuted at number 60 on the US Billboard Hot Country Singles & Tracks for the week of October 10, 1998. It peaked at number 33 on the Billboard Hot 100, making it Montgomery's first top 40 hit. It is his most successful single to date.

Year-end charts

References

1998 singles
John Michael Montgomery songs
Songs written by Blair Daly
Atlantic Records singles
1998 songs
Songs written by Will Rambeaux